Henry I (died 14 June 1190) was Count of Tyrol from 1180 until his death.

Henry was a younger son of Count Berthold I of Tyrol and his wife Agnes(?), a daughter of Count Otto I of Ortenburg. In 1180 he succeeded his father as Tyrolean count, jointly with his brother Berthold II. After Berthold II died in 1181, Henry I ruled alone.

Henry married Agnes, a daughter of Lord Adalbero of Wangen and sister of Bishop Frederick of Trent. The couple had the following children:
 Albert IV (d. 1253)
 a daughter, who married Meinhard II, Count of Gorizia
 Agnes, married Count Henry II of Eschenlohe (d. 1272)
 Matilda, married Count Berthold III of Eschenlohe (d. 1260)

12th-century births
Year of birth unknown
1190 deaths
Counts of Tyrol
12th-century people of the Holy Roman Empire